Josh Mansour (Arabic: جوش منصور; born 17 June 1990) is a professional rugby league footballer who plays as a er for Newtown Jets. He has represented Lebanon and Australia at international level.

He has previously played for the Penrith Panthers and the South Sydney Rabbitohs in the National Rugby League, and at representative level played for the Prime Minister's XIII, NSW City Origin and New South Wales in the State of Origin series.

Early life
Mansour was born in Sydney, Australia. He is of Lebanese and Cuban descent through his father, Fidel, who was born north of Beirut, Lebanon, and is of Portuguese descent through his mother, Angie, who was born in the Madeira archipelago.

He played junior rugby league for the St Johns Eagles and the Kingsgrove Colts, and attended Holy Spirit College in Lakemba during his high school years.

Playing career
After being cut from the Canterbury-Bankstown Bulldogs' S. G. Ball Cup side, Mansour attended an open trial for the North Sydney Bears and was subsequently signed by the South Sydney Rabbitohs, playing in their NYC team between 2008 and 2010. Mansour was selected in 2010 as Winger of the Year NYC and was chosen as the NYC Player of the Year at the Rabbitohs. 

He represented Lebanon in the 2009 European Cup, and played for the Junior Kangaroos in 2010. 

Mansour graduated to South Sydney's full-time training squad in 2011, playing for their feeder team, the North Sydney Bears, in the New South Wales Cup. 

After a number of strong performances for Norths, Mansour caught the attention of Phil Gould at the Penrith Panthers who offered him a contract for the 2012 season.

2012

In round 9, Mansour made his NRL debut for the Penrith Panthers at Penrith Stadium on the wing in the 10–44 loss against the Melbourne Storm. Mansour scored a try on debut. He was named the Panthers rookie of the year after playing in 14 matches and scoring 7 tries in his debut year.

2013
On 5 March, Mansour extended his contract with the club to the end of the 2014 season. In round 23, against the New Zealand Warriors, Mansour scored a spectacular put down of the ball just before going into the in goal in the 28–24 win at Mt Smart Stadium. Mansour played in 14 matches and scored 4 tries in 2013.

2014
In February, Mansour played in the Panthers inaugural Auckland Nines squad. On 3 June, he re-signed, keeping him at the Panthers until the end of the 2016 season after declining a lucrative offer from the Canberra Raiders. Mansour finished the season as the Panthers highest tryscorer with 15 tries in 22 matches.

On 12 October, Mansour played on the wing and scored a try for Prime Minister's XIII in the 34–16 win over Papua New Guinea. 

He made his Australian international debut against New Zealand national rugby league team on 25 October in the Four Nations, where the Kiwis won 30–12 at Suncorp Stadium. Mansour scored his first try in the green and gold of Australia against Samoa in Australia's 44–18 victory at WIN Stadium, and played in the 22–18 Four Nations final loss against New Zealand.

2015
Mansour scored 6 tries from 12 games in 2015. He was named in the Lebanon 48-man train-on squad ahead of two 2017 Rugby League World Cup qualifiers against South Africa, however he didn't take part in either match.

2016
In February, Mansour played in the Panthers Auckland Nines. On 8 May, he played for NSW City Origin against Country, scoring a try in the 44–30 win, and was soon after rewarded with selection in the New South Wales State of Origin squad. On 1 June, Mansour made his debut for New South Wales against Queensland, playing on the wing in the 4–6 loss at ANZ Stadium. Mansour featured in all 3 matches for Blues on the wing in their 2–1 series loss in the 2016 State of Origin series. At the 2016 Dally M Awards night, Mansour was awarded as the Winger of the Year. Mansour finished the season with 25 matches and being the Panthers highest try-scorer with 16 tries. At the end of the year, Mansour was named in the Australian 2016 Four Nations 24-man squad. Mansour played in one match of the tournament, in the first round against Scotland, where he played on the wing and scored 2 tries in the 54–12 win at Craven Park in Hull. On 3 November, Mansour suffered a serious knee injury during a freak mishap at training during a game of touch footy when he collided with Dragons star Josh Dugan, ruling Mansour from the tournament and the first half of the 2017 season.

2017
On 4 June 2017, Mansour played his first game for the season after returning from a serious knee injury. He scored a try in Penrith's 38–0 demolition of Canterbury at Stadium Australia. On 2 September 2017, Mansour played his 100th NRL game against the Manly Warringah Sea Eagles. At the end of the season, Mansour was chosen in The Australian squad for The 2017 Rugby League World Cup.  Mansour played in a match against France and then played in the match against Lebanon where he marked up against lookalike Abbas Miski.  Australia went on to win The 2017 World Cup but Mansour did not feature in the final.

2018
Mansour started the season well for Penrith until suffering a shocking facial injury in Round 6 against the Gold Coast Titans when he was accidentally kneed in the face by Gold Coast winger Anthony Don.  After having surgery on his badly fractured face, Mansour said "The biggest risk was obviously losing my eye, My surgeon has done over 2000 people and he reckons he has only seen a dozen like this, and they are all from motor accidents and soldiers". On 17 April, Mansour signed a three-year contract extension to stay at Penrith until the end of the 2021 season.

2019
Mansour started the 2019 NRL season as one of the club's first choice wingers.  Mansour scored his first try of the season in Round 5 against the Gold Coast in a 30–24 defeat.  On 14 May 2019, Mansour was demoted to reserve grade by coach Ivan Cleary as Penrith had only won 2 out of 9 matches to start the season.

Mansour only spent the 1 week in reserve grade for Penrith before being recalled back to the first team.  Mansour subsequently played on the wing as Penrith defeated Parramatta 16–10 at the new Western Sydney Stadium.

Mansour made a total of 19 appearances for Penrith in the 2019 NRL season and scored one try as the club finished 10th on the table and missed out on the finals for the first time since 2015.

2020
In round 4 of the 2020 NRL season, Mansour scored his first try in 14 months as Penrith defeated the New Zealand Warriors 26–0 at the Campbelltown Sports Ground.

In round 15, Mansour played his 150th first grade game and scored two tries as Penrith defeated Cronulla-Sutherland 38–12 at Penrith Stadium.

Mansour played a total of 22 games and scored 12 tries for Penrith in the 2020 NRL season as the club claimed the Minor Premiership and reached the 2020 NRL Grand Final.  Mansour played on the wing for Penrith in the final and scored a try in the first half which was disallowed when the score was 6–0 in Melbourne's favour.

In the second half, Mansour scored a try but it wasn't enough for Penrith who lost 26–20.

On 8 November, Mansour was informed by the Penrith club that he could seek an early release from his contract after learning that he would not be required for the 2021 season.  Mansour told Fairfax Media columnist Danny Weidler he was summoned to meet Penrith coach Ivan Cleary and football manager Matt Cameron at a Homebush restaurant 48 hours after Penrith's grand-final loss to Melbourne where he was informed of the news.

2021
On 13 January, Mansour signed a two-year deal to join South Sydney.

In round 1 of the 2021 NRL season, he made his debut for Souths in a 26–18 loss against Melbourne.

After being demoted to reserve grade before round 2, Mansour was recalled to the Souths squad for round 3.  Mansour scored his first official try for Souths in a 26–16 victory over arch rivals the Sydney Roosters.

In round 19, Mansour scored two tries for South Sydney in a 60–22 victory over the New Zealand Warriors.

In round 21, he scored two tries in a 40–12 victory over Parramatta.

The following week, Mansour scored another two tries for South Sydney in their 36–6 victory over the Gold Coast.

On 24 August, Mansour was ruled out for the rest of the season after suffering a knee injury in South Sydney's round 23 loss against Penrith.

2022
Mansour was limited to only five games for South Sydney in the 2022 NRL season where he scored two tries. 

In the opening group stage match of the 2021 Rugby League World Cup, Mansour scored the opening try for Lebanon in their 34–12 loss against New Zealand. In the final group stage match, Mansour scored a hat-trick in Lebanon's 74–12 victory over Jamaica.

On 1 November, Mansour was released by the South Sydney club.

2023
On 19 February, Mansour played for Newtown in a pre-season trial against Canterbury at the Belmore Sports Ground.
On 28 February, Mansour joined Newtown for the 2023 season as a free agent.

Personal life
Mansour's wife, Daniella, gave birth to their first child, Siana, on 2 November 2017; their second child, Andre, was born on July 31, 2019. 

Mansour is a fan of Arsenal F.C.

References

External links

Penrith Panthers profile
Panthers profile
2017 RLWC profile

 

1990 births
Living people
Australia national rugby league team players
Australian people of Cuban descent
Australian people of Lebanese descent
Australian people of Portuguese descent
Australian rugby league players
Junior Kangaroos players
Lebanese people of Australian descent
Lebanese people of Cuban descent
Lebanon national rugby league team captains
Lebanon national rugby league team players
New South Wales City Origin rugby league team players
New South Wales Rugby League State of Origin players
Newtown Jets players
North Sydney Bears NSW Cup players
Penrith Panthers players
Prime Minister's XIII players
Rugby league players from Sydney
Rugby league wingers
South Sydney Rabbitohs players
Sportspeople of Cuban descent
Sportspeople of Lebanese descent
Windsor Wolves players